Gillis van Coninxloo (now also referred to as Gillis van Coninxloo II but previously referred to as Gillis van Coninxloo III) (24 January 1544 – January 1607) was a Flemish painter of landscapes who played an important role in the development of Northern landscape art at the turn of the 17th century.  He spent the last 20 years of his life abroad, first in Germany and later in the Dutch Republic.

Life
He was born in Antwerp and studied under Pieter Coecke van Aelst, Lenaert Kroes and Gillis Mostaert.  He travelled in France after completing his training.  He became a member of the Antwerp Guild of Saint Luke in 1570 and worked in Antwerp until 1585 when Antwerp fell to the Spanish.  He left first for Middelburg and then in 1587 for Frankenthal where he was active until 1595.  He then moved to Amsterdam where he died in 1607.

He had many pupils including Pieter Brueghel the Younger, Govert Govertsz van Arnhem, Willem van den Bundel, Gillis van Coninxloo III, Jonas van Merle, Hercules Seghers and Jacques van der Wijen.

Work

Coninxloo ranks as one of the most important Flemish landscape painters of around the turn of the 17th century.  He exercised a strong influence on Jan Brueghel the Elder, Pieter Schoubroeck, Roelandt Savery, and other Flemish and Dutch landscape painters of this period.

His early landscapes were often Northern Mannerist versions of the established world landscape type, though with close views of trees already narrowing the panoramic view.  Beginning in the 1590s Coninxloo introduced a new approach into Flemish landscape painting, with close-up views of forests reminiscent of Albrecht Altdorfer and the Danube school nearly a century earlier and almost or entirely shutting out a distant view.  While earlier forest landscapes had used forests as the backdrop for human activity, van Coninxloo turned them into the subject proper by submerging tiny human figures in elaborate compositions of trees on a hugely exaggerated scale.  A Forest Landscape of 1598 in the Liechtenstein Collection is the first work to take this approach to its extreme: the sky is only visible in a few patches between branches and a single tiny human figure reclines under a tree. This painting achieves great intensity and atmospheric quality through its fine shades of brown and green and its accentuated handling of light.

During his stay in Frankenthal from 1588 to 1595, he influenced several better known Flemish émigré landscape painters, who are now collectively referred to as the 'Frankenthal School'.  The early 17th century art historian Karel van Mander wrote about Coninxloo in his Schilder-boeck.  Van Mander stated that Coninxloo's teacher Pieter Coeke van Aelst was his cousin, and that I know at this time of no better landscape painter, and I notice that they are following his manner very much in Holland.

The influence of his work spread in Holland by means of his designs for large-scale prints, mainly engraved by Flemish émigré printmakers Nicolaes de Bruyn and Jan van Londerseel who published in the Dutch Republic.

Works
Some of his paintings are:
 "The Judgment of Midas" (Dresden)
 "Latona" (Hermitage, St. Petersburg)
 "Landscape with Venus and Adonis" (Frankenthal)
 "Landscape with Duck Hunters" (Saarland Museum, Saarbrücken)

Notes

References
Sutton, Peter C., ed. (1987). Masters of 17th-century Dutch Landscape Painting. Boston: Museum of Fine Arts. 
 Vlieghe, H. (1998). Flemish art and architecture, 1585-1700. Yale University Press Pelican history of art. New Haven: Yale University Press. 

 External links 

Web Gallery of Art: Biography of Gillis van Coninxloo
Web Gallery of Art: Paintings by Gillis van Coninxloo
Gillis van Coninxloo on ArtcyclopediaPieter Bruegel the Elder: Drawings and Prints'', a full text exhibition catalog from The Metropolitan Museum of Art, which includes material on Gillis van Coninxloo (see index)

1544 births
1607 deaths
Flemish Mannerist painters
Flemish landscape painters
Painters from Antwerp